Oleg Kimovich Vasiliev (born 22 November 1959) is a Russian former pair skater who competed internationally for the Soviet Union. With his then-wife Elena Valova, he is the 1984 Olympic champion, 1988 Olympic silver medalist, and three-time World Champion (1983, 1985, 1988). Their coach throughout their career was Tamara Moskvina. After retiring from competition, Vasiliev became a coach, leading the pair of Tatiana Totmianina / Maxim Marinin to the 2006 Olympic title.

Personal life 
Vasiliev was born in Leningrad (modern-day Saint Petersburg), Russian SFSR, to parents Ludmila Konstantinovna Vasilieva, a nurse, and Kim Mikhailovich Vasiliev. He graduated from the Institute for Physical Culture in Saint Petersburg.

Vasiliev moved to Chicago, Illinois in December 1997. He was married to Valova from 1984 to 1992. He later married a Saint Petersburg resident named Valentina (divorced in 2000), with whom he has a daughter, Katia. His first daughter was born circa 1994.

Around 2013, Vasiliev married his third wife, Natalia, who is from Moscow. As of August 2016, the couple lives in Moscow with their daughter Varvara (born circa 2014).

Career

Competitive career 

Vasiliev's parents decided to introduce him to skating when he was five because he had had pneumonia several times as a child and his doctor recommended an outdoor activity. As a single skater, Vasiliev won a Junior national title.

Coach Tamara Moskvina invited Vasiliev to switch to pair skating several times before he agreed, at age 18. Initially, he was physically ill-suited for the discipline and had much work to develop his muscles. He and his first partner, Larisa Selezneva, argued incessantly and split after three months. Moskvina then paired him with Elena Valova, with whom he continued to train in Leningrad (Saint Petersburg).

Valova/Vasiliev's breakthrough came in the 1982–83 season. They won bronze at the Prize of Moscow News, gold at the 1982 Skate America, and then silver at the 1983 European Championships. The pair concluded their season by winning their first World title. They missed the 1983 national championships due to Vasiliev's broken jaw.

In 1984, Valova/Vasiliev won their first European title and then took gold at the 1984 Winter Olympics in Sarajevo. The deaths of several Soviet government officials, including one during the Olympics, cast a pall over the Soviet team and the athletes were told not to show too much joy. The pair took silver at their final event of the season, the 1984 World Championships.

In 1985, the pair won gold at both the European and World Championships but 1986 saw the emergence of the young Moscow pair Ekaterina Gordeeva / Sergei Grinkov. Although Valova/Vasiliev were awarded gold at the 1986 Europeans, they finished second to the Muscovites at both the 1986 and 1987 Worlds.

In their final amateur season, Valova/Vasiliev took silver at the 1988 Winter Olympics behind Gordeeva/Grinkov but then prevailed over the reigning Olympic champions at the 1988 World Championships. After winning their third World title, Valova/Vasiliev retired from ISU competition. After performing for a year in Igor Bobrin's ice theatre, they signed a U.S. contract – the first Soviets to do so without losing their citizenship. The pair performed together in various shows and events until the end of 1997.

Vasiliev was awarded the Order of Friendship of Peoples.

Coaching career 

Vasiliev initially had no interest in coaching but changed his mind. He coached one season for the Latvian federation and then about two years for the French federation near Paris. Since 1998, Vasiliev has coached in Chicago and Saint Petersburg. During his time in the United States, he worked at the Oakton Ice Arena in Park Ridge, Illinois. He has coached the following skaters:

 Vera Bazarova / Andrei Deputat: From April 2014 to 2016.
 Tatiana Totmianina / Maxim Marinin: From January 2001 to March 2006. (2006 Olympic champions and two-time World champions)
 Maria Mukhortova / Maxim Trankov: From December 2006 to March 2010. (2008 European silver medalists)
 Viktoria Volchkova: From spring 2002 to mid-2003. (2002 Grand Prix Final bronze medalist)
 Fumie Suguri: From autumn 2004 to 2005.
 Katarina Gerboldt / Alexander Enbert: From May 2013 to April 2014.
 Ivan Righini
 Nicole Della Monica / Matteo Guarise

Programs 
(with Valova)

1979–1988

1989–1997

Results

Amateur career with Valova

Professional career with Valova

References

External links

Navigation 

1959 births
Living people
Russian male pair skaters
Soviet male pair skaters
Olympic figure skaters of the Soviet Union
Figure skaters at the 1984 Winter Olympics
Figure skaters at the 1988 Winter Olympics
Russian figure skating coaches
Olympic gold medalists for the Soviet Union
Olympic silver medalists for the Soviet Union
Figure skaters from Saint Petersburg
Recipients of the Order of Friendship of Peoples
Olympic medalists in figure skating
World Figure Skating Championships medalists
European Figure Skating Championships medalists
Medalists at the 1984 Winter Olympics
Honoured Coaches of Russia
Medalists at the 1988 Winter Olympics
Universiade medalists in figure skating
Universiade bronze medalists for the Soviet Union
Competitors at the 1981 Winter Universiade